Marcus Lawler (born 28 February 1995) is an Irish sprinter specialising in the 200 metres. He finished fourth at the 2013 European Junior Championships and represented his country at two senior European Championships. He won the bronze medal at the 2019 Summer Universiade in the men's 200 metres event.

International competitions

Personal bests
Outdoor
100 metres – 10.30 (+0.7 m/s, Regensburg 2017)
200 metres – 20.40 (+0.9 m/s, Cork 2018)
Indoor
60 metres – 6.78 (Athlone 2018)
200 metres – 20.96 (Athlone 2016)

References

External links
 
 
 
 

1995 births
Living people
Irish male sprinters
Universiade bronze medalists for Ireland
Universiade medalists in athletics (track and field)
Competitors at the 2017 Summer Universiade
Medalists at the 2019 Summer Universiade
Athletes (track and field) at the 2020 Summer Olympics
Olympic athletes of Ireland